The Harbour line is a branch line of the Mumbai Suburban Railway operated by Central Railway. It was named so because it catered to the eastern neighbourhoods along the city's natural harbour. Its termini are Chhatrapati Shivaji Maharaj Terminus (CSMT), Goregaon and Panvel on the CSMT-Goregaon, CSMT-Panvel and Panvel-Goregaon routes.

The line is a double line and therefore does not have any fast trains on it. The line runs parallel to the Central Railway line till just before Sandhurst Road station where the line turns eastward and runs elevated up till Sewri. At Wadala Road, the line branches into two. The first line joins with the Western line at Mahim and terminates at Goregaon. The second line follows through Mankhurd into the city of Navi Mumbai, where it again branches out into two lines, one going to Thane (Trans-Harbour Line) and the other to Panvel. The first stop outside Mumbai is the township of Vashi.

The stations in Navi Mumbai are well maintained and beautifully designed by CIDCO. There are IT offices above the stations. The Railbridge connecting Vashi and Mankhurd railway stations running over Thane creek, parallel to the road bridge has brought Navi Mumbai closer to Mumbai, boosting the development of the region.

About 580 services run daily on the Harbour line. Approximately 208 of those are on the Thane-Vashi-Nerul-Panvel route and 172 of those run on the CSMT-Goregaon route.

History
The first section of the line, between Kurla and Reay Road, opened on 12 December 1910. In 1925, the line was connected to the then Victoria Terminus via an elevated rail corridor between Dockyard Road and Sandhurst Road. Suburban services to Mankhurd began in 1951.

Later, the line was extended from Mankhurd to serve most of Navi Mumbai through the suburban rail network via The Mankhurd–Belapur–Panvel rail corridor was commissioned in phases in the 1990s. Vashi was connected in May 1992, Nerul in February 1993, Belapur in June 1993 and Panvel in June 1998. The corridor was converted to double line in April, 2000.

In 2004, the Trans-Harbour line was opened to the public. The line directly connected Vashi to Thane. This proved to be a boon for commuters of the two stations, who, until then, had to take a circuitous route via Mumbai city and had to change trains at Kurla.

The last direct current (DC) suburban local train ran on the Harbour line on 10 April 2016. The special train left Kurla at 11:30 pm and reached CSMT at 12:15 am. The iconic yellow-and-maroon DC local trains had their first service on 3 February 1925, when the first electric local ran between CSMT and Kurla ran on the Harbour line. The Indian Express reported that not a single ticket was sold. After the last DC service ran, Central Railway officially announced the completion of DC to AC conversion on the Harbour line.

On 4 September 2016, the last 9 car train was put into a sunset as all the trains were converted to 12 coach, which increases the carrying capacity of the line by 33%.

Stations
(All Harbour line services are slow, which means they halt at all passing by stations.)

At Wadala Road, the Harbour line splits into two corridors, one going to Panvel and the other to Andheri.

The exact split occurs 800 metres north of Wadala Road station, at a location known as Ravli (variously spelled as Raoli, Ravali or Rawli) corresponding to the nearby Ravli slum. There is no railway station at Ravli Junction. However, due to the critical Ravli Junction Yard signal box, there are various public references to this name in news articles and other sources.

Towards Panvel

Towards Andheri–Goregaon

Future development
Work is completed up to Goregaon. The project will cost . Service is started as on 29 March 2018. Further extension of this line has been accepted under MUTP III till Borivali.

Kurla–Shivajinagar service
CR has sought permission from the Railway Board to run EMUs on the Harbour line between Kurla and Shivajinagar in Pune. The service would provide direct connectivity between Navi Mumbai and Pune, which is currently not available. EMUs will be modified to include six motor cars.

CR plans to use 16 coach mail/express trains to cover the 170 km distance in approximately 2 hours and 50 minutes. Stations on the line will be Kurla, Vashi, Belapur, Panvel, Karjat, Lonavla and Shivajinagar.

See also
 Mumbai Suburban Railway
 List of Mumbai Suburban Railway stations
 CST–Panvel Fast Corridor
 Central Railway

References

External links
Harbour line timetable (November 2016)
All about Travelling in Mumbai, including Harbour Railway, Local Train Timetable
HARBOUR Railway local Train Timetable

Rail transport in Mumbai
Mumbai Suburban Railway lines
Transport in Navi Mumbai
Railway lines opened in 1910
1910 establishments in India